Geoffrey Ronald Robertson  (born 30 September 1946) is a human rights barrister, academic, author and broadcaster. He holds dual Australian and British citizenship.

Robertson is a founder and joint head of Doughty Street Chambers. He serves as a Master of the Bench at the Middle Temple, a recorder, and visiting professor at Queen Mary University of London.

Education and personal life
Robertson was born in Sydney, Australia, and grew up in the suburb of Eastwood. His father, Frank, who would go on to be a senior officer of the Commonwealth Bank, and later a stockbroker, survived an RAAF training flight crash in Chiltern, Victoria, in 1943.

He went to Epping Boys High School and then attended the University of Sydney, where he graduated with a Bachelor of Arts in 1966 and a Bachelor of Laws with First-Class Honours in 1970, before winning a Rhodes Scholarship to study at the University of Oxford, where he graduated with a Bachelor of Civil Law from University College, Oxford in 1972. In 2006 he was awarded an honorary degree of Doctor of Laws by the University of Sydney.

In 1990, Robertson married the author Kathy Lette, and they lived together in London with their children until their separation in 2017. They had met in 1988 during the filming of an episode of Hypothetical for ABC Television; Robertson was dating Nigella Lawson at the time and Lette was married to Kim Williams. In Robertson's 2010 Who's Who entry, his hobbies are listed as tennis, opera and fishing.

Robertson became a British citizen in 2003.

Awards
Robertson won Australian Humanist of the Year in 2014 for his work as a human rights lawyer and advocate.

Legal career
Robertson became a barrister in 1973, and was appointed QC in 1988. He became well known after acting as defence counsel in the celebrated English criminal trials of OZ, Gay News, the ABC Trial, The Romans in Britain (the prosecution brought by Mary Whitehouse), Randle & Pottle, the Brighton bombing and Matrix Churchill. He also defended the artist J. S. G. Boggs from a private prosecution brought by the Bank of England regarding his depictions of British currency.

In 1989 and 1990 he led the defence team for Rick Gibson, a Canadian artist, and Peter Sylveire, a director of an art gallery, who were charged with outraging public decency for exhibiting earrings made from human foetuses.

He has also acted in well known libel cases, including defending The Guardian against Neil Hamilton MP. Robertson was threatened by terrorists for representing Salman Rushdie.

In 1972 he advised Peter Hain as a McKenzie friend when Hain defended himself on several charges including conspiracy to trespass arising from his involvement in anti-apartheid protests, as a protest against the apartheid regime. During the ten-day trial at the Old Bailey Hain dismissed his QCs, but retained Robertson and another as advisers, before being convicted and fined £200. Robertson was also employed to defend John Stonehouse after his unsuccessful attempt at faking his own death in 1974.

In March 2000 in the Independent Schools Tribunal, sitting at the Royal Courts of Justice, he successfully defended A. S. Neill's Summerhill School, a private free school. The proceedings were brought by OFSTED on behalf of David Blunkett, the Education Minister, who was seeking the closure of the school. The case was later dramatised by Tiger Aspect Productions in a TV series entitled Summerhill and broadcast on BBC Four and CBBC.

In August 2000, Robertson was retained by the heavyweight boxing champion Mike Tyson for a hearing before the British Boxing Board of Control (BBBoC). The disciplinary hearing related to two counts relating to Tyson's behaviour after his 38-second victory over Lou Savarese in Glasgow in June that year. Tyson escaped a ban from fighting in Britain. Robertson successfully deployed a defence of freedom of expression for Tyson, the first use before the BBBoC, but Tyson was convicted on the other count and fined.

In 2002 he defended Dow Jones in Dow Jones & Co Inc v Gutnick, a case where Joseph Gutnick, an Australian mining magnate, sued Dow Jones after an article critical of him was published on the website of Barron's newspaper. Gutnick successfully applied to the High Court of Australia, requesting for the case to be heard in Australia rather than the United States, where the First Amendment protects free speech. Robertson then appealed the case to the United Nations Human Rights Committee. The case was described as a "very worrying decision" as it potentially opened the door for libel cases related to internet publishing to be heard in any country and in multiple countries for the same article.

In December 2002 Robertson was retained by The Washington Post to represent its veteran war correspondent, Jonathan Randal, in The Hague at the United Nations Court, the International Criminal Tribunal for the former Yugoslavia. He established the principle of qualified privilege for the protection of journalists in war crimes courts.

In 2006 Geoffrey Robertson successfully defended The Wall Street Journal (WSJ) in Jameel v Wall Street Journal Europe. The case centred on an article published in the WSJ in 2002, which alleged that the United States were monitoring the bank accounts of a Saudi Arabian businessman to ensure he was not funding terrorists. Jameel, who was represented by Carter-Ruck, was originally awarded £40,000 in damages but this was overturned in favour of the WSJ. The case was viewed by The Lawyer as a landmark case which redefined the earlier case of Reynolds v Times Newspapers Ltd, upholding the right to publish if it is deemed to be in the public interest.

In early 2007, instructed by the Indigenous lawyer Michael Mansell, Robertson took proceedings for the Aboriginal Tasmanians to recover 15 sets of their stolen ancestral remains, then being held in the basement of the Natural History Museum in London. He accused the museum of wishing to retain them for "genetic prospecting".

Robertson has appeared in cases before the European Court of Human Rights and in other courts across the world.

Among these, Robertson was involved in the defence of Michael X in Trinidad and has appeared for the defence in a libel case against the former Singaporean prime minister Lee Kuan Yew. He was also involved in the controversial inquest of Helen Smith and also in the Blom-Cooper Commission inquiry into the smuggling of guns from Israel through Antigua to Colombia.

Robertson has been on several human rights missions on behalf of Amnesty International, such as to Mozambique, Venda, Czechoslovakia, Malawi, Vietnam and South Africa.

Until 2007 he sat as an appeal judge at the UN Special Court for Sierra Leone.

In 2010 Robertson unsuccessfully defended Julian Assange, the founder of WikiLeaks, in extradition proceedings in the United Kingdom.

In 2013 Robertson was appointed an honorary associate of the National Secular Society.

On 28 January 2015 he represented Armenia with barrister Amal Clooney at the European Court of Human Rights (ECHR) in the Perinçek v. Switzerland case. He called Doğu Perinçek a "vexatious litigant pest" at the ECHR hearing.

From 2016, Robertson has been representing former Brazilian president Lula da Silva with appeals to the United Nations Human Rights Committee regarding Lula's treatment by the Brazilian justice system.

Robertson is a patron of the Media Legal Defence Initiative.

Media career
Since 1981, often with long intervals in between, Robertson has hosted an Australian television series of programmes called Geoffrey Robertson's Hypotheticals. These shows invite notable people, often including former and current political leaders, to discuss contemporary issues by assuming imagined identities in hypothetical situations. This program was often parodied by Steve Vizard on the Australian comedy sketch program Fast Forward.

He speaks at public events including many literary festivals. In 2009 he spoke at the Ideas Festival in Brisbane, Australia.

Writing career
Robertson has written many books. One of them, The Justice Game (1998), is on the school curriculum in New South Wales, Australia.

His 2005 book The Tyrannicide Brief: The Story of the Man Who Sent Charles I to the Scaffold details the story of John Cooke, who prosecuted Charles I of England in the treason trial that led to his execution. After the Restoration, Cooke was convicted of high treason and hanged, drawn and quartered.

In his 2006 revision of Crimes Against Humanity, Robertson deals in detail with human rights, crimes against humanity and war crimes. The book starts with the history of human rights and has several case studies such as the case of General Augusto Pinochet of Chile, the Balkans Wars, and the 2003 Iraq War. His views on the United States' atomic bombings of Hiroshima and Nagasaki in Japan can be considered controversial. He considers the Hiroshima bomb was certainly justified, and that the second bomb on Nagasaki was most probably justified but that it might have been better if it was dropped outside a city. His argument is that the bombs, while killing more than 100,000 civilians, were justified because they pushed Emperor Hirohito of Japan to surrender, thus saving the lives of hundreds of thousands of allied forces, as well as Japanese soldiers and civilians.

In his 2010 book, The Case of the Pope, Robertson claims that Pope Benedict XVI is guilty of protecting pedophiles because the church swore the victims to secrecy and moved perpetrators in Catholic sex abuse cases to other positions where they had access to children while knowing the perpetrators were likely to reoffend. This, Robertson believes, constitutes the crime of assisting underage sex and when he was still Cardinal Ratzinger, the retired pope approved this policy up to November 2002. In Robertson's opinion, the Vatican is not a sovereign state and the pope is not immune to prosecution.

In An Inconvenient Genocide: Who Now Remembers the Armenians? (2014) Robertson presents an argument based on fact, evidence and his knowledge of international law, claiming that the horrific events that occurred in 1915 constitute genocide.

Bibliography
Reluctant Judas, Temple-Smith, 1976
Obscenity, Weidenfeld & Nicolson, 1979
People Against the Press, Quartet, 1983
Geoffrey Robertson's Hypotheticals, Angus & Robertson, 1986
Does Dracula Have Aids?, Angus & Robertson, 1987
Geoffrey Robertson's Hypotheticals – A New Collection, ABC, 1991
Freedom the Individual and the Law, Penguin, 1993 (7th ed)
The Justice Game, 1998 Chatto; Viking edition 1999
Crimes Against Humanity – The Struggle for Global Justice, Alan Lane, 1999; revised 2002 (Penguin paperback) and 2006 
The Tyrannicide Brief, Chatto & Windus, 2005
Media Law (with Andrew Nicol QC), Sweet & Maxwell, 5th edition, 2008
Statute of Liberty, Vintage Books Australia, March 2009, 
Was there an Armenian Genocide? (online), October 2009, 
The Case of the Pope: Vatican Accountability for Human Rights Abuse, Penguin, October 2010, 
The Massacre of Political Prisoners in Iran, 1988, with Sarah Graham, Abdorrahman Boroumand Foundation, 2011, ; and Addendum 2013, ; see 1988 executions of Iranian political prisoners.
Mullahs Without Mercy: How to Stop Iran's First Nuclear Strike, Vintage, October 2012, 
Dreaming too loud : Reflections on a race apart, Vintage, 2013, 
Stephen Ward was Innocent, OK, Biteback Publishing, 2013, 
An Inconvenient Genocide: Who Now Remembers the Armenians?, 2014
Rather His Own Man: Reliable Memoirs, 2018
Who Owns History? Elgin's Loot and the Case for Returning Plundered Treasure, Biteback Publishing, 2019,

References

External links 
Geoffrey Robertson QC, profile at Doughty Street Chambers website
 
Audio on a talk about the trial of King Charles I by Geoffrey Robertson for Bristol Radical History Group
, Charlie Rose, 16 March 2015
"Iran’s President Raisi: mullah without mercy evades justice", The Australian, 26 June 2021 (on Ebrahim Raisi)

1946 births
Living people
Academics of Queen Mary University of London
Australian emigrants to England
Australian non-fiction writers
Australian King's Counsel
Australian Rhodes Scholars
British republicans
Australian republicans
British humanists
Australian humanists
British social commentators
British barristers
British legal writers
Members of the Middle Temple
Officers of the Order of Australia
People educated at Epping Boys High School
Lawyers from Sydney
Special Court for Sierra Leone judges
University of Sydney alumni
Writers from New South Wales
Naturalised citizens of the United Kingdom
British King's Counsel
Australian judges of United Nations courts and tribunals
British judges of United Nations courts and tribunals
Human rights lawyers